Andre Putra Wibowo (born September 17, 1996) is an Indonesian professional footballer who plays as a defender for Liga 2 club Persijap Jepara.

Club career

Persis Solo
He was signed for Persis Solo to play in Liga 2 in the 2020 season.

Career statistics

Club

References

External links
 Andre Putra at Soccerway
 Andre Putra at Liga Indonesia

1996 births
Living people
Indonesian footballers
Persiba Balikpapan players
Association football defenders
People from Klaten Regency
Sportspeople from Central Java
21st-century Indonesian people